Amarapuram is a village in the state of Tamil Nadu in India. It is located at the banks of Karamanayar River in Thoothukudi District, about 15 km South of Thiruchendur. Amarapuram is the home of twin temples: Kasankathaperumal and Kasamadiamman Temple and Sudalaimadaswamy and Petchiamman Temple. The main temple festival (Kodai) is held annually in the month of Purataasi.

Thoothukudi
Villages in Thoothukudi district